Sarada Saradaga ( Funny funnily) is a 2006 Telugu-language comedy film, produced by G.V.Prasad on Damini Entertainments Pvt Ltd banner and directed by S. V. Krishna Reddy. Starring Rajendra Prasad, Srikanth, Sindhu Tolani, Siva Balaji, Pranathi  and music also composed by S.V.Krishna Reddy.

Plot 
The film begins on Raghava (Srikanth) owner of a beauty parlor, who suffers from his lady customers as they are so fascinated towards him. To discard them his assistant Ali (Ali) falsifies Raghava as a married person. Once, a charming girl (Sindhu Tolani) acquainted with Raghava whom he too loves. Being incognizant of it, Ali rehashes with her also when disheartened Lavanya leaves him. Nevertheless, Raghava wants her back. During that plight, Balaraju (Rajendra Prasad) the close friend of Raghava plots a by creating a character Maya as Raghava's wife who is a domineering woman and also having illegal affair with a guy Subba Rao. Being aware of it, Lavanya wants to see Maya, so, Balaraju approaches his resident girl Siri (Pranathi) whose husband Prem (Siva Balaji) stays in Dubai and requests her to act as Maya. Right now, Balaraju & Siri counterfeit as Subba Rao & Maya when dead heat situation occurs as Prem returns and witnesses their romance. Eventually, Balaraju's wife Sundari (Ruchika) spots it. The remaining story is how Balaraju's plan boomerangs and thereby shatters the relationship of 3 couples.

Cast 

Rajendra Prasad as Balaraju
Srikanth as Raghava
Sindhu Tolani as Lavanya
Siva Balaji as Prem
Pranathi as Siri / Maaya
Brahmanandam as Kona
Ali as Ali
Sunil as a witness in a murder case
M. S. Narayana as Public
Dharmavarapu Subramanyam as Police Inspector
Giri Babu as Prem's father
A.V.S as Lavanya's father
Venu Madhav as Waiter
Gundu Hanumantha Rao as Constable
Jhansi as Balaraju's servant
Jayalalita as Lavanya's mother
Kalpana
Ammudi
Nandana
Master Sandeep as Balaraju's son

Soundtrack 

Music composed by S. V. Krishna Reddy. Music released on Supreme Music Company.

References

External links 
mymazaa review

2006 films
2000s Telugu-language films
Indian comedy films
Films directed by S. V. Krishna Reddy
Films scored by S. V. Krishna Reddy